Dr. Cornelius Nase Campbell House is a historic home located at Stanfordville in Dutchess County, New York.  It was built about 1845 and is a gable-ended, 2-story timber-frame dwelling with -story kitchen wing in a vernacular Italianate style.  It has a cross-gable, bay windows, and a cupola. It features a full-length verandah on the front facade and patterned slate shingles.  In 1872, it became the "President's House for the Christian Bible Institute.  In 1909 it again became a private residence and a boarding house until abandoned in 1979.

It was added to the National Register of Historic Places in 2007.

See also

National Register of Historic Places listings in Dutchess County, New York

References

Houses on the National Register of Historic Places in New York (state)
Italianate architecture in New York (state)
Houses completed in 1845
Houses in Dutchess County, New York
National Register of Historic Places in Dutchess County, New York